Gosford is an electoral district of the New South Wales Legislative Assembly in Australia. The electorate covers the western parts of the City of Gosford, including central Gosford and Woy Woy.

It is represented by Liesl Tesch of the Labor Party, elected at the 2017 by-election.

The electorate was created in 1950. At the redistribution prior to the 2007 election much of the district of Gosford, then held by Chris Hartcher for the Liberal Party, became part of the district of Terrigal while Gosford absorbed most of the former district of Peats, then held by Marie Andrews for the Labor Party. Antony Green describes the redistribution as effectively being that Gosford was renamed Terrigal while Peats was renamed Gosford.

Demographics
The percentage of people in Gosford who were born overseas was 15% which is slightly lower than the national average at 22.2% and the percentage of people who have Australian citizenship is only slightly higher than the national average of 86.1% at 88.4%. As for languages spoken at home English only was the most common language spoken by 90.4% of the population which is substantially higher than national average at 78.5%. Italian was second with 0.4%, while no other language was spoken by more than 0.3% of the total population. Anglicanism was the most common religion at 28.2%, followed by Catholicism at 26.6%, No Religion with 14.9% and Uniting Church at 5.6%. Median incomes for the population aged 15 years and over was only slightly lower in both weekly individual income and weekly household income but slightly higher in the weekly family income category.

Members for Gosford

Election results

References

Gosford
Gosford
1950 establishments in Australia
Central Coast (New South Wales)
Central Coast Council (New South Wales)